This is the discography for American hip hop musician Sheek Louch.

Studio albums

Collaborative albums

Mixtapes

Singles

Featured singles

Guest appearances

See also 
 The LOX discography

References 

Discographies of American artists
Hip hop discographies